A fusible alloy is a metal alloy capable of being easily fused, i.e. easily meltable, at relatively low temperatures. Fusible alloys are commonly, but not necessarily, eutectic alloys.

Sometimes the term "fusible alloy" is used to describe alloys with a melting point below . Fusible alloys in this sense are used for solder.

Introduction
From a practical view, low-melting alloys can be divided into the following categories:
Mercury-containing alloys
Only alkali metal-containing alloys
Gallium-containing alloys (but neither alkali metal nor mercury)
Only bismuth, lead, tin, cadmium, zinc, indium, and sometimes thallium-containing alloys
Other alloys (rarely used)

Some reasonably well-known fusible alloys are Wood's metal, Field's metal, Rose metal, Galinstan, and NaK.

Applications
Melted fusible alloys can be used as coolants as they are stable under heating and can give much higher thermal conductivity than most other coolants; particularly with alloys made with a high thermal conductivity metal such as indium or sodium. Metals with low neutron cross-section are used for cooling nuclear reactors.

Such alloys are used for making the fusible plugs inserted in the furnace crowns of steam boilers, as a safeguard in the event of the water level being allowed to fall too low. When this happens the plug, being no longer covered with water, is heated to such a temperature that it melts and allows the contents of the boiler to escape into the furnace. In automatic fire sprinklers the orifices of each sprinkler is closed with a plug that is held in place by fusible metal, which melts and liberates the water when, owing to an outbreak of fire in the room, the temperature rises above a predetermined limit.

Bismuth on cooling expands by about 3.3% by volume. Alloys with at least half of bismuth  display this property too. This can be used for mounting of small parts, e.g. for machining, as they will be tightly held.

Low melting alloys and metallic elements

Well known alloys

Other alloys
(see also solder alloys)

See also
Liquid metal
List of elements by melting point

References

Further reading

Weast, R.C., "CRC Handbook of Chemistry and Physics", 55th ed, CRC Press, Cleveland, 1974, p. F-22

External links
Fusible (Low Temp) Alloys
Fusible Alloys. Archived from the original on 2012-10-12.
Jenson, W.B. "Ask the Historian - Onion's fusible alloy" 

Coolants